Hot Sauce Committee Part Two is the eighth and final studio album by American hip hop band Beastie Boys, released on May 3, 2011, through Capitol Records. The project was originally planned to be released in two parts, with Hot Sauce Committee, Pt. 1 originally planned for release in 2009. The release was delayed after band member Adam "MCA" Yauch's cancer diagnosis. After a two-year delay, only one collection of tracks, Part Two, was released and the plan for a two-part album was eventually abandoned after Yauch's death on May 4, 2012.

The album was critically acclaimed upon release, with the energetic rapping, experimental production, and disregard for contemporary hip hop trends being praised. It also performed well commercially, debuting at No. 2 on the Billboard 200 chart. The release was supported by four singles – "Lee Majors Come Again", "Too Many Rappers" featuring Nas, "Make Some Noise", and "Don't Play No Game That I Can't Win" featuring Santigold.

Background

The album was previously known by the working title Tadlock's Glasses, which was stated to refer to a former bus driver named Tadlock, who used to drive for Elvis Presley's back-up singers. Presley once gave Tadlock a pair of glasses which he was proud of. It was later speculated that the Tadlock's Glasses story was simply a joke misinterpreted by the media.

A large amount of material was recorded, and the plan was to release the album, now called Hot Sauce Committee, in two parts as the Beastie Boys revealed to Drowned in Sound. Regarding the album's structure, Yauch stated, "It’s a combination of playing and sampling stuff as we’re playing, and also sampling pretty obscure records. There are a lot of songs on the record and there are a lot of short songs and they kind of all run into each other." A commentary track included with the Check Your Head re-release mentions that Bob Dylan would appear on the album.

Part 1 
The first part of the album was intended to be called Hot Sauce Committee, Pt. 1 and was prepared for release, with artwork revealed and a planned release date of September 15, 2009. In an interview, the trio stated that the album was completed and that they would tour the United Kingdom to support the new record. This was delayed after Adam "MCA" Yauch was diagnosed with cancer. On July 20, 2009, Yauch announced the cancellation of tour dates, and assured fans that he should be fine after surgery. In October 2009, Adam Yauch announced that the band had not yet decided a new release date, but was quoted saying he was hoping to release it in the first half of 2010.

Drowned in Sound also gave a review of the first part on 28, June 2009, the same time they did the interview with the Beastie Boys for the album. It features most of the tracks which appeared on Part Two in a different order with the additional skit "Bundt Cake" which was described as "Another skit, this time a mere 21 seconds over a crisp drum break with snatches of cyber vocals".

The track listing was listed as follows.

Part 2
An email sent out on October 17, 2010, from the Beastie Boys announced that Hot Sauce Committee Pt. 1 would be shelved indefinitely, and Hot Sauce Committee Pt. 2 would be released in 2011. An email sent the following week now clarified that Pt. 2 would be released with almost exactly the same track list as was announced for Pt. 1, excluding the track "Bundt Cake." No date was set for Part 1. The project was finally released in May 2011 under the title Hot Sauce Committee Part Two, with a slightly altered track listing including a new version of "Too Many Rappers".

According to Andrew Eastwick from Tiny Mix Tapes, "Long Burn the Fire" paid homage to the 1970s soul-rock band Black Merda with its fuzz-inflected guitar riffs. Its song title, Eastwick continued, "may also be a sly nod" to music critic Robert Christgau, who recommended the band's 1972 record of the same name to the Beastie Boys in his review of their 1994 album Ill Communication.

Leaks and promotion
On April 6, 2011, "Make Some Noise" was leaked online five days ahead of its release date and subsequently made available via their blog. It was released on time as a digital download and as a limited edition 7" vinyl single for Record Store Day five days later with a Passion Pit remix of the track as a B-side. To promote the album, the Beastie Boys released clips of two songs: "Lee Majors Come Again" features hardcore punk, while the "B-Boys in the Cut" is an a cappella piece. The tracks were previously released with a select few copies of the Check Your Head vinyl edition package.

"Lee Majors Come Again" and "Here's a Little Something for Ya" are featured in remixed form on the Activision video game, DJ Hero. "Lee Majors Come Again" also appears in Skate 3. A clean version of "Pop Your Balloon" was released on the soundtrack to NBA Live 10 in mid-2009. The album was launched on April 23, 2011 by live-streaming the album online via boombox inside Madison Square Garden; two days later, they streamed the explicit album version via SoundCloud to combat the leaking of the clean promo version over the previous weekend. The online launch had been announced with the cryptic message "This Sat, 10:35 a.m. EST - Just listen, listen, listen to the beat box" sent by email on April 22, 2011.

"Here's a Little Something for Ya" also features on the soundtrack for 2011 film Real Steel.

Singles
"Lee Majors Come Again" was released as the album's first single in 2009. It was released as a 7" single, and some of these singles were distributed with select copies of a reissue box set of the group's third studio album Check Your Head A version of the song "Too Many Rappers", featuring Nas, was released as the album's second single in July 2009. It peaked at #93 on the Billboard Hot 100, becoming the Beastie Boys' first single in five years to chart on the Hot 100, after 2004's "Ch-Check It Out", which peaked at #68. "Too Many Rappers" has also been nominated for a Grammy Award for Best Rap Performance by a Duo or Group. This may not be regarded as belonging to this album as at the time it was intended for and promoted as part of the (never released) Hot Sauce Committee Pt 1 album. A revised version of "Too Many Rappers" was included on the Hot Sauce Committee Pt 2 album.

The next single, "Make Some Noise" was released as a download on April 11, 2011 and five days later as 7" vinyl single for Record Store Day. "Make Some Noise" reached at #7 in Alternative Songs chart, #15 in Rock Songs, #18 in Japan Hot 100 and #76 in Canadian Hot 100. On July 26, 2011, "Don't Play No Game That I Can't Win" was released as the fourth single. It debuted at #80 on Billboard's R&B/Hip-Hop Songs chart, marking the group's first appearance on the chart in 24 years, after 1987's "Brass Monkey" which peaked at #83.

Critical reception

Upon its release, Hot Sauce Committee Part Two received acclaim from music critics. At Metacritic, which assigns a normalized rating out of 100 to reviews from mainstream critics, the album received an average score of 83, based on 42 reviews, which indicates "universal acclaim". Stephen Thomas Erlewine of AllMusic gave the album four and a half stars out of five, saying "The Hot Sauce Committee, Pt. 2 does find the Beastie Boys at their best." Dave Simpson of The Guardian gave the album four out of five stars, saying "Now in their fourth decade of working together, the Beasties' eighth studio album revisits their old-skool roots. However, their wit and invention transforms such tired cliches into their freshest offering in years."

Rob Sheffield of Rolling Stone gave the album four out of five stars, saying "We get the sound of master musicians in their comfort zone, doing everything their own way. Nobody would want to hear the Beasties try anything else." Matt Diehl of the Los Angeles Times gave the album four out of four stars, saying "This is vintage Beasties, all exuberant pass-the-mike battle rhymes and gritty break-beats so funky, it’s near impossible not to head-bob through the entire record." Mark Richardson of Pitchfork Media gave the album a 7.0 out of 10, saying "Taken together, these 16 songs, which seem to touch on just about everything the Beastie Boys have said and done, may not add up to something amazing, but they do the job."

Commercial performance
Hot Sauce Committee Part Two debuted at number 2 on the Billboard 200, selling 128,000 copies in its first week.

Track listing

Note
The bonus 7" has tracks 17 and 18 reversed.

Personnel
Personnel adapted from album liner notes.
Mike D – vocals, drums
Ad-Rock – vocals, guitars
MCA – vocals, bass guitar, upright bass
Money Mark – keyboards
DJ Hurricane – turntables
Mix Master Mike – turntables
Beastie Boys – producers, engineers, art direction

Charts

Weekly charts

Year-end charts

See also
List of Billboard number-one R&B albums of 2011
List of number-one rap albums of 2011 (U.S.)

References

External links
 

2011 albums
Beastie Boys albums
Capitol Records albums
Electro albums by American artists
Hip hop albums by American artists